Mexitrechus is a genus of beetles in the family Carabidae, containing the following species:

 Mexitrechus coarctatus (Bates, 1881)
 Mexitrechus michoacanus (Bolivar & Pieltain, 1941)
 Mexitrechus mogotensis Barr, 1982
 Mexitrechus occidentalis (Mateu, 1974)
 Mexitrechus quirogai (Bolivar & Pieltain, 1943)
 Mexitrechus tepoztlanensis (Bolivar & Pieltain, 1941)

References

Trechinae